Glass Houses is the seventh studio album by American singer-songwriter Billy Joel, released on March 12, 1980. The album itself topped the Pop Albums chart for six weeks and was ranked  on Billboards 1980 year-end album chart. The album is the 41st best selling album of the 1980s, with sales of 7.1 million copies in the U.S. alone. In 1981, Joel won a Grammy Award for "Best Male Rock Vocal Performance" for his work on Glass Houses. According to music critic Stephen Thomas Erlewine, the album featured "a harder-edged sound" compared to Joel's other work, in response to the punk and new wave movements. This was also the final studio album to feature the original incarnation (Joel, Richie Cannata, Doug Stegmeyer, Russell Javors and Liberty DeVitto) of the Billy Joel Band, augmented by new lead guitarist David Brown. Multi-instrumentalist Cannata left the band just before the sessions began for Joel's next studio album, 1982's The Nylon Curtain.

 Background 
This album was the third collaboration between Joel and producer Phil Ramone, following The Stranger and 52nd Street and the final such collaboration in association with Home Run.

Opening with the sound of glass shattering, Glass Houses has more of a hard rock feel than Joel's previous albums. The cover shows Joel poised to throw a rock through the two-story window of his real-life waterfront glass house in Cove Neck. On some versions, the back cover shows Joel looking through the hole that the rock made in the glass. This alludes to the adage that "people in glass houses shouldn't throw stones".

Critical reception

Rolling Stone critic Paul Nelson stated: "Billy Joel writes smooth and cunning melodies, and what many of his defenders say is true: his material's catchy. But then, so's the flu." In Christgau's Record Guide: The '80s (1990), Robert Christgau said: "From the straight-up hubba-hubba of 'You May Be Right' to the Rick Wakeman ostinatos of 'Sometimes a Fantasy' to the McCartneyesque melodicism of 'Don't Ask Me Why' to the what-it-is of 'It's Still Rock and Roll to Me,' it's all rock and roll to him, but to me it's closer to what pop meant before ironists and aesthetes, including yours truly, appropriated the term. Closer than any skinny-tie bands, that's for sure: gregarious, shameless, and above all profitable. Of course, if it doesn't make up in reach what it lacks in edge, ironists and aesthetes needn't notice it's there. And beyond 'Sleeping With the Television On,' I couldn't tell you thing one about side two, which I just played three times."

In 2004, the pop-culture journalist and rock critic Chuck Klosterman praised the album in an essay on Joel titled "Every Dog Must Have His Every Day, Every Drunk Must Have His Drink" from his book Sex, Drugs, and Cocoa Puffs (the title of the essay refers to a line from the Glass Houses song "Don't Ask Me Why"). In particular, Klosterman praised some of the more obscure tracks from the album including "All for Leyna", "I Don't Want to Be Alone", "Sleeping with the Television On" and "Close to the Borderline."

In a retrospective review, Stephen Thomas Erlewine of AllMusic wrote: "It may not be punk – then again, it may be his concept of punk – but Glass Houses is the closest Joel ever got to a pure rock album."

Track listing
All songs written by Billy Joel.

 Personnel Musicians Billy Joel – vocals, acoustic piano, electric pianos, synthesizers, accordion, harmonica
 Richie Cannata – organs, saxophones, flute
 David Brown – acoustic and electric guitars (lead)
 Russell Javors – acoustic and electric guitars (rhythm)
 Doug Stegmeyer – bass guitar
 Liberty DeVitto – drums and percussionProduction'''
 Phil Ramone – producer
 Jim Boyer – engineer
 Bradshaw Leigh – assistant engineer
 Ted Jensen – mastering at Sterling Sound (New York, NY).
 Brian Ruggles – technician
 Steve Cohen – lighting
 Jim Houghton – photography
 Michele Slagter – production assistant
 Jeff Schock – product management

Accolades

Grammy Awards

|-
|  style="width:35px; text-align:center;" rowspan="2"|1981 || rowspan="2"| Glass Houses || Best Rock Vocal Performance – Male|| 
|-
| Album of the Year || 
|-

American Music Awards

|-
|  style="width:35px; text-align:center;" rowspan="2"|1981 || Glass Houses'' || Favorite Pop/Rock Album|| 
|-
| Billy Joel (performer) || Favorite Pop/Rock Male Artist || 
|-

Charts

Weekly charts

Year-end charts

Certifications and sales

References

Billy Joel albums
1980 albums
Albums produced by Phil Ramone
Columbia Records albums
Grammy Award for Best Male Rock Vocal Performance
New wave albums by American artists